Nino Borghi (1918-1994) was an Italian-born Austrian art director.

Selected filmography
 Arena of Death (1953)
 The King of Bernina (1957)
 Coffin from Hong Kong (1964)
 The Bandits of the Rio Grande (1965)
 My Father, the Ape and I (1971)
 Superbug, Super Agent (1972)
 Karl May (1974)
 Sweet Derriere (1975)
 Goetz von Berlichingen of the Iron Hand (1979)

References

Bibliography

External links

1918 births
1994 deaths
Italian art directors
Austrian art directors
Film people from Milan
Italian emigrants to Austria